Lesnoy Mole Rear Range Light is an active lighthouse and range light in Saint Petersburg, Russia. It is located in a dockyard area on the waterfront and guides ships into the commercial harbor of Saint Petersburg.

At a height of  it is the fourth tallest "traditional lighthouse" in the world, the tallest in Russia, and the tallest range light in the world.

See also

 List of lighthouses in Russia
 List of tallest lighthouses in the world

References

Lighthouses in Russia
Buildings and structures in Saint Petersburg